The LPGA Skins Game was an unofficial-money golf tournament on the LPGA Tour from 1990 to 2003. It was played at the Stonebriar Country Club in Frisco, Texas from 1990 to 1998 and at the Wailea Golf Club in Wailea, Hawaii in 2003.

Winners
ConAgra LPGA Skins Game
2003 Karrie Webb

JCPenney/LPGA Skins Game
1999-2002 No tournament
1998 Laura Davies
1997 Annika Sörenstam
1996 Laura Davies
1995 Dottie Mochrie
1994 Patty Sheehan
1993 Betsy King
1992 Pat Bradley
1991 No tournament
1990 Jan Stephenson

References

Former LPGA Tour events
Golf in Texas
Golf in Hawaii
Recurring sporting events established in 1990
Recurring sporting events established in 2003
1990 establishments in Texas
1998 disestablishments in Texas
2003 establishments in Hawaii
2003 disestablishments in Hawaii
Women's sports in Texas
History of women in Hawaii